Gary Kenneth Jones (born 5 January 1951) is an English former footballer who played as a winger.

Born in Prescot, which was then in Lancashire, Jones joined Everton from school, and remained with the club for ten years, but played relatively infrequently; only in his last two seasons did he play more than 13 games a season for the first team. He joined Birmingham City in 1976, spending two seasons with the club before finishing his playing career with Fort Lauderdale Strikers in the North American Soccer League.

Following his retirement he managed a local public house, The Albert in Lark Lane, Liverpool.

References 

1951 births
Living people
Sportspeople from Prescot
English footballers
Association football wingers
Everton F.C. players
Birmingham City F.C. players
Fort Lauderdale Strikers (1977–1983) players
English Football League players
North American Soccer League (1968–1984) players
English expatriate sportspeople in the United States
Expatriate soccer players in the United States
English expatriate footballers